Abu Ahmad Fazlul Karim (1928–29 April 1987) was a Bangladeshi politician and physician. He was Member of Parliament of Mymensingh-20.

Birth and early life 
Karim was born in 1928 in the village of Nayapara in the Chowddo Shata Union of Kishoreganj. His father is Ibrahim Bhuiyan and mother is Raushan Ara Binu.

After completing his primary education, he passed Matriculation from Kodalia SI High School in 1945, ISC from Dhaka Intermediate College in 1947 and MBBS from Dhaka Medical College in 1953.

Career 
Fazlul Karim was a doctor. He became involved in politics during his student life. he was elected to parliament from Mymensingh-20 as a Bangladesh Nationalist Party candidate in 1979.

In Ziaur Rahman's cabinet, he served as the state minister for health and birth control. He also served as the State Minister for Public Works. In Abdus Sattar Cabinet, he served as the state minister for radio, sports and culture.

Death 
Karim died on 29 April 1987.

References 

Bangladesh Nationalist Party politicians
1928 births
1987 deaths
2nd Jatiya Sangsad members
Dhaka College alumni
Dhaka Medical College alumni
People from Kishoreganj District
Bangladeshi physicians